A trap, pony trap (sometimes pony and trap) or horse trap is a light, often sporty, two-wheeled or sometimes four-wheeled horse- or pony-drawn carriage, usually accommodating two to four persons in various seating arrangements, such as face-to-face or back-to-back.

"Pony and trap" is also used as Cockney rhyming slang for "crap" meaning nonsense or rubbish, or defecation.

References

External links
 

Carriages